Kurt Faltlhauser  (born 14 September 1940 in Munich) is a German politician, representative of the Christian Social Union of Bavaria.

He was a member of the Landtag of Bavaria between 1974 and 1980 and 1998 and 2008. He was from 1994 to 1995 Parliamentary Secretary to the Federal Minister of Finance, from 1995 to 1998 Bavarian State Minister and Head of the State Chancellery and from 1998 to 2007 Bavarian State Minister of Finance.

Publications
 Miteigentum – Das Pieroth-Modell in der Praxis, ECON-Verlag, Düsseldorf und Wien 1971, 
 Geld und Gemeinden, Südwest Information, München 1972
 Klaus Esser, Kurt Faltlhauser: Beteiligungsmodelle, Verlag Moderne Industrie, München 1974, 
 Kurt Faltlhauser: Unternehmen und Gesellschaft, Theorie und Praxis der Sozialbilanz, Erich Schmidt Verlag, Berlin 1978, 
 Kurt Faltlhauser, Edmund Stoiber: Politik aus Bayern., Busse und Seewald, Herford 1982, 
 Steuerstrategie, Kölner Universitätsverlag, Köln 1988
 Im Münchner Westen. Von der Wies'n bis Aubing., Bayerland VA, Dachau 1989, 
 Klaus Rose, Kurt Faltlhauser: Die Haushälter – Ist die Zukunft finanzierbar?, Kölner Universitätsverlag, Köln 1990, 
 Ansichten aus dem Münchner Westen, Bayerland VA, Dachau 1993, 
 Finanzpolitik der Zukunft – Das Prinzip Nachhaltigkeit, Olzog, München 2002,

See also
List of Bavarian Christian Social Union politicians

References

1940 births
Living people
Politicians from Munich
Ministers of the Bavaria State Government
Members of the Bundestag for Bavaria
Members of the Bundestag 1994–1998
Members of the Bundestag for the Christian Social Union in Bavaria
Members of the Landtag of Bavaria
Officers Crosses of the Order of Merit of the Federal Republic of Germany